The Lockhart Independent School District is a public school district based in Lockhart, Texas. In addition to Lockhart, the district also serves the portions of Mustang Ridge, Niederwald, and Pettytown in Caldwell County, as well as the unincorporated communities of Dale, Lytton Springs, Maxwell, Brownsboro, Delhi, Elm Grove, McMahan, Mendoza, Saint Johns Colony, Seawillow, Taylorsville, and Tilmon.

The district's motto is "100 percent success – Every Child – Every Time!"

In 2008–09, 2009–10, and 2010–11, the school district was rated "Recognized" by the Texas Education Agency.

Administration
 Mark Estrada, superintendent (2018–present)
 Rolando "Rudy" Treviño, superintendent (2014)
 Brenda Spillman, board president

Schools

High schools
 Grades 9-12
 Lockhart High School

Junior high school
 Grades 6-8
 Lockhart Junior High School
 2007 National Blue Ribbon School

Elementary schools
 Grades K-5
 Bluebonnet Elementary
 Clear Fork  Elementary
 Navarro Elementary
 Plum Creek Elementary
 Grades PK-5
 Alma Brewer Strawn Elementary
 Grades PK
 George W. Carver Early Education Center

Alternative schools
 Pride High School
 Lockhart Discipline Management Center

References

External links
 Lockhart ISD

School districts in Caldwell County, Texas